The Play-offs of the 2001 Fed Cup Europe/Africa Zone Group I were the final stages of the Group I Zonal Competition involving teams from Europe and Africa. Those that qualified for this stage placed first in their respective pools.

The four teams were then paired up the team from a different placing of the other group for a play-off tie, with the winners being promoted to the World Group Play-offs.

Sweden vs. Netherlands

  advanced to the World Group Play-offs, where they were drawn against . They won 3–2, and thus advanced to the World Group for next year.

Israel vs. Slovenia

  advanced to the World Group Play-offs, where they were drawn against . They lost 0–3, and thus were placed back to Zonal Group I for next year.

See also
Fed Cup structure

References

External links
 Fed Cup website

2001 Fed Cup Europe/Africa Zone